Chris Evans is an American actor who made his film debut in Biodiversity: Wild About Life!, a 1997 educational film co-produced by the National Fish and Wildlife Foundation, before making appearances in minor television roles in the early 2000s. Evans has described his filmography of the early to mid 2000s as being "really terrible". He appeared in the television comedy-drama Opposite Sex (2000), comedies Not Another Teen Movie (2001) and The Perfect Score (2004), and the action thriller Cellular (2004).

In 2005, Evans had his breakthrough performance as Johnny Storm / Human Torch in the superhero film Fantastic Four, his highest-paid role at the time, and reprised the role for the film's 2007 sequel Fantastic Four: Rise of the Silver Surfer. Fantastic Four would be the first of many roles in films adapted from comic books and graphic novels for Evans, including Casey Jones in TMNT (2007), Jake Jensen in The Losers (2010), Lucas Lee in Scott Pilgrim vs. the World (2010), and Curtis Everett in Snowpiercer (2013). His most prolific comic book movie role would be as Steve Rogers (Captain America) in the Marvel Cinematic Universe (MCU) series of films, with credited appearances and cameos as the character in eleven films and one video game; notable appearances include the headlining films Captain America: The First Avenger (2011), Captain America: The Winter Soldier (2014), and Captain America: Civil War (2016), and the ensemble films The Avengers (2012), Avengers: Age of Ultron (2015), Avengers: Infinity War (2018), and Avengers: Endgame (2019).

While comic book films formed the bulk of Evans's filmography from the late 2000s through the entirety of the 2010s, he concurrently acted in a range of non-comic book projects, including Danny Boyle's psychological thriller Sunshine (2007), Marc Webb's drama Gifted (2017), and a critically acclaimed performance in Rian Johnson's Knives Out (2019). He also starred in several romantic comedy films, including The Nanny Diaries (2007), What's Your Number? (2011), and Playing It Cool (2015), the latter of which he also executive produced. Evans made his directorial debut in 2014 with the romantic drama Before We Go, which he also produced and starred in. His Broadway debut was in the 2018 revival of Kenneth Lonergan's play Lobby Hero, for which he was nominated for a Drama League Award.

Film

Television
{| class="wikitable plainrowheaders sortable" 
|-
!scope="col"| Year
!scope="col"| Title
!scope="col"| Role
!scope="col" class="unsortable" | Notes
!scope="col" class="unsortable" | 
|-
! rowspan="3" scope="row" |2000
|Opposite Sex
|Cary
|8 episodes
|style="text-align:center;"|
|-
|
|
|Episode: "Guilt" 
|style="text-align:center;"| 
|-
|Just Married
|Josh
|Unaired
|style="text-align:center;"|
|-
!scope=row|2001
|Boston Public
|
|Episode: "Chapter Nine" 
|style="text-align:center;"| 
|-
!scope=row|2002
|Eastwick
|Adam 
|Unaired pilot
|style="text-align:center;"| 
|-
!scope=row|2003
|Skin
|Brian 
|Episode: "Pilot"
|style="text-align:center;"| 
|-
!scope=row|2008
|Robot Chicken
|Various voices 
|Episode: "Monstourage" 
|style="text-align:center;"|
|-
!scope=row|2015
|America's Game: The 2014 New England Patriots
| Narrator
| Documentary
|style="text-align:center;"|
|-
!scope=row|2017
|America's Game: The 2016 New England Patriots
| Narrator
| Documentary
|style="text-align:center;"|
|-
!scope=row|2018
|Chain of Command
| Narrator
|Documentary series
|style="text-align:center;"|
|-
!scope=row|2020
|Defending Jacob
|
|8 episodes; also executive producer
|style="text-align:center;"|
|-
|}

Video games

Stage

Music videos

Web

References

External links
 

Evans, Chris
Evans, Chris